The West Indies cricket team toured Pakistan in October to November 1986 and played a three-match Test series against the Pakistan national cricket team. The Test series was drawn 1–1. West Indies were captained by Viv Richards and Pakistan by Imran Khan. In addition, the teams played a five-match Limited Overs International (LOI) series which West Indies won 4–1.

Test series summary

First Test

Second Test

Third Test

One Day Internationals (ODIs)

West Indies won the Wills Series 4-1.

1st ODI

2nd ODI

3rd ODI

4th ODI

5th ODI

References

External links

1986 in Pakistani cricket
1986 in West Indian cricket
International cricket competitions from 1985–86 to 1988
Pakistani cricket seasons from 1970–71 to 1999–2000
1986